John Bowler Fitzgibbons is the founder and chairman of Basin Holdings, comprising a group of controlled, privately-held companies active in energy and industrial manufacturing. He is also the founder and chairman of Talus Group Holdings, comprising a group of controlled, privately-held companies active in a broad range of markets and geographies.

Education 
Fitzgibbons attended Harvard University, graduating cum laude with a B.A. in government.

Career 
Fitzgibbons founded, managed, and sold several businesses in the Russian energy market, including Khanty Mansiysk Oil Corporation (KMOC), which sold to Marathon Oil Corporation in 2003, and Integra Group, which was taken public on the London Stock Exchange in 2007.

In 2007, Fitzgibbons co-founded Deerpath Capital, a fund management group focused on direct lending in the US middle market, where he is currently a partner.

In 2010, Fitzgibbons founded Basin Holdings and in 2012, he founded Talus Group Holdings.

Philanthropy 

Fitzgibbons currently serves on the board of trustees at Milton Academy. 
He is also a member of the Council on Foreign Relations. Fitzgibbons formerly served as chairman of The SUNY Research Foundation and co-chairman of the Cancer Research Institute.

References 

Year of birth missing (living people)
Living people
20th-century American businesspeople
21st-century American businesspeople
American philanthropists
Harvard College alumni
Milton Academy alumni
Phillips Exeter Academy alumni
American chief executives